Rosy Blue is an Indian-Belgian company that has interests in media, real estate, financial services and retail. The company also trades in rough diamonds, manufactures and distributes polished diamonds and jewellery.

The company is one of the largest diamond traders worldwide and has 12 offices in seven countries around the world: Belgium, Israel, Hong Kong, Japan, United States, China, UAE (Dubai). Russell Mehta is the current managing director of the Indian arm of the company.

Rosy Blue is a De Beers sightholder.

History 

The company was founded in 1960 by Arunkumar Mehta and his cousin Bhanuchandra Bhansali. In the 70’s the company headquartered in Antwerp, Belgium and expanded its operations to several other diamond centers.

In 2005 Rosy Blue became a founding and certified member of the Responsible Jewellery Council.

In 2008 Rosy Blue became a signatory to the United Nations Global Compact.

In 2017, Rosy Blue was named in both Panama Papers and Paradise Papers as an entity which transferred money to safe havens to avoid taxes in the country.

References 

1960 establishments in Belgium
Belgian brands
Companies based in Antwerp
Diamond industry in Belgium
Panama Papers
Paradise Papers